The Conservative Party or The Right (H) is a liberal-conservative political party in Norway. It is the major party of the Norwegian centre-right, and was the leading party in government as part of the Solberg cabinet from 2013 to 2021. The current party leader is former Prime Minister Erna Solberg. The party is a member of the International Democrat Union and an associate member of the European People's Party.

The party is traditionally a pragmatic and moderately conservative party strongly associated with the traditional elites within the civil service and Norwegian business life. During the 20th century, the party has advocated economic liberalism, tax cuts, individual rights, support of monarchism, the Church of Norway and the Armed Forces, anti-communism, pro-Europeanism, and support of the Nordic model; over time, the party's values have become more socially liberal in areas such as gender equality, LGBT rights, and immigration and integration issues; the party defines itself as a party pursuing a "conservative progressive policy based on Christian cultural values, constitutional government and democracy". In line with its Western bloc alignment during the Cold War era, the party strongly supports NATO, which Norway co-founded, and has consistently been the most outspokenly pro-European Union party in Norway, supporting Norwegian membership during both the 1972 and 1994 referendums.

The Conservative Party traditionally caters to the educated elite; it has the most highly educated voters of all parties, and is the most popular party among elite groups. In the postwar era, the party formed a grand consensus with the Labour Party regarding foreign and security policy—frequently expressed by the maxim "the foreign policy is settled" (utenrikspolitikken ligger fast)—that led Norway to co-found NATO and enter into a close alliance with the United States, and the parties' economic policies have gradually become more similar. Both parties are pragmatic, relatively technocratic, anti-populist, and close to the political centre. The party supports the Nordic model but also a certain amount of semi-privatisation through state-funded private services.

Founded in 1884, the Conservative Party is the second-oldest political party in Norway after the Liberal Party. In the interwar era, one of the main goals for the party was to achieve a centre-right alliance against the growing labour movement, when the party went into decline. In the post-war era until 2005, the party participated in six governments: two 1960s national governments (Lyng's Cabinet and Borten's Cabinet); one 1980s Conservative Party minority government (Willoch's First Cabinet); two 1980s three-party governments (Willoch's Second Cabinet and Syse's Cabinet); in the 2000s Bondevik's Second Cabinet; and from 2013 to 2021 it was the dominant partner in a coalition government that also included the Christian Democrats and the Liberal Party.

History 

The Conservative Party of Norway (Høire, now spelled Høyre, lit. "The Right") was founded in 1884 after the implementation of parliamentarism in Norway. The jurist Emil Stang was elected the first chairman of the party. Stang underlined important principles for the work in Høyre. The party was to be a social party of reforms that worked within the constitutional frames set by a parliamentary democracy.

Høyre's electoral support has varied. In the 1981 election it obtained 31.7%, its best result since 1924. The result in 1993 was 17%, which saw the election influenced by the EU membership issue which divided the Liberal Party. The 1997 parliamentary election resulted in the lowest support for Høyre since 1945, with only 14.3% of the votes. Since then it has seen support ranging from just over 14% to just under 27%.

Early 1900s 
In the beginning of the 20th century, Høyre took the initiative to construct a modern Norwegian communications network. After the devastating First World War the party felt it important to work for the reconstruction of sound economic policies. An example of this is the resolution Høyre passed in 1923 introducing old-age insurance; owing to the condition of the state's finances it was not possible to continue this effort. It was the leading party in opposition during the post-war years in Norway, and fought against the Labour Party's regulating policy. Høyre wanted another future for Norway, consisting of private initiative and creative forces.

Høyre has been active in the construction of the welfare system in Norway, and has on several occasions taken the initiative to correct injustices in social care regulations. Additionally, Høyre has advocated that the state's activity must concentrate on its basic problems and their solutions.

Post-war years 
During Norway's post-war years Høyre has consolidated its position as a party with appeal to all parts of the nation. Non-socialist co-operation as an alternative to socialism has always been one of Høyre's main aims. Høyre has led several coalition governments. The Christian Democratic Party was one of Høyre's coalition partners both in 1983–86 and 1989–90.

The party strongly supported the Western alignment of Norway during the Cold War; it strongly supports NATO, which Norway co-founded in 1949, and has consistently been the most outspokenly pro-European Union party in Norway, supporting Norwegian membership during both the referendum of 1972 and that of 1994.

At the parliamentary election in 1993, it was impossible to present a credible non-socialist government alternative, because Høyre's former coalition parties, The Christian Democrats and the Centre Party, both campaigned strongly against Norwegian membership of the EU.

Before the parliamentary election in 1997 the Labour Party proclaimed that it would not be willing to govern the country if it did not obtain more than 36.9% of the votes. In the event it obtained 35%, and other parties had to form a government. Originally, there were serious discussions between Høyre, the Christian Democrats and Venstre concerning this task, but in the end the two latter parties joined forces with the Centre Party to create a minority government without Høyre.

Today 
In the parliamentary election in September 2001, Høyre obtained 21.2 percent of the votes. After a series of discussions Høyre was once again able to take part in a coalition government, this time with the Christian Democratic Party (KrF), and the Liberal Party (V). The total percentage obtained for these three parties at last general election was 37.5. Høyre, as the largest party in the coalition government, had 38 members in the present Storting, and 10 of the 19 ministers in the Government were Høyre representatives. Høyre's three focal areas this period were to establish a rise in quality in Norway's educational system, lower taxes and produce a higher service level in state sectors.

In the 2005 parliamentary election, Høyre obtained 14.1% of the votes. The election outcome put Høyre back in opposition, and the party got 23 members in the present Storting.

In the 2009 parliamentary election, Høyre obtained 17.2% of the votes, and 30 members in the present Storting.

During the local elections of 2011, however, the party gained 27.6 percent of the vote, and it has since then, without exceptions, polled first and second.

In the 2013 parliamentary election, Høyre obtained 26.8 percent of the votes, and 48 members in the present Storting. Høyre formed a minority government, with confidence and supply from KrF and V. The Government was reelected in 2017 and became a majority Government in 2019.

Ideology
Høyre has been described as a conservative or liberal conservative party, and it defines itself as a party pursuing a "conservative progressive policy based on Christian cultural values, constitutional government and democracy."

Høyre is considered a centre-right reform party profess to the moderately conservative political tradition, similar to the CDU of Germany. The party broadly supports the Nordic model, like all large parties in Norway. In relative terms, the party advocates a degree of fiscal free-market policies, including tax cuts and relatively little government involvement in the economy, while still supporting the welfare state and the social market economy. Høyre is also the only party in the Storting which proposes a reduction in public spending. 

Traditionally, the party supports established institutions such as the monarchy, the armed forces, and the state Church of Norway. Its social policies were always considered moderate and pragmatic for its time, but have gradually become more socially liberal. The party voted in 2008 for a law that recognised same-sex marriage and gay adoption rights.

Membership and voter demographic
The party has around 30,000 registered members (2018). The Central Board of the Conservative Party meets seven times a year to discuss important matters such as budget, organisational work, plans, party platforms, and drawing up political lines.

The party traditionally caters to the educated elite; it has the most highly educated voters of all parties, and is the most popular party among elite groups.

List of party chairmen and leaders

 Emil Stang, 1884–1889
 Christian Homann Schweigaard, 1889–1891
 Emil Stang, 1891–1893
 Christian Homann Schweigaard, 1893–1896
 Emil Stang, 1896–1899
 Francis Hagerup, 1899–1902
 Ole Larsen Skattebøl, 1902–1905
 Edm. Harbitz, 1905–1907
 Fredrik Stang, 1907–1911
 Jens Bratlie, 1911–1919
 Otto Bahr Halvorsen, 1919–1923
 Ivar Lykke, 1923–1926
 Carl Joachim Hambro, 1926–1934
 Johan H. Andresen, 1934–1937
 Ole Ludvig Bærøe, 1937–1940
 Arthur Nordlie, 1945–1950
 Carl Joachim Hambro, 1950–1954
 Alv Kjøs, 1954–1962
 Sjur Lindebrække, 1962–1970
 Kåre Willoch, 1970–1974
 Erling Norvik, 1974–1980
 Jo Benkow, 1980–1984
 Erling Norvik, 1984–1986
 Rolf Presthus, 1986–1988
 Kaci Kullmann Five, 1988
 Jan P. Syse, 1988–1991
 Kaci Kullmann Five, 1991–1994
 Jan Petersen, 1994–2004
 Erna Solberg, 2004–present

Electoral results

See also 

Politics of Norway

Notes

References

External links 
 Høyre – Official site
 Conservative Party (Høyre) – Information in English
 Unge Høyre – Official site of the Young Conservatives
 Høyres Studenterforbund – Site of the Conservative Students' Union
 Election results for the Conservative Party in the 2011 local elections

 
1884 establishments in Norway
Conservative parties in Norway
International Democrat Union member parties
Liberal conservative parties
Member parties of the European People's Party
Political parties established in 1884